Get Hip Records is an independent Pittsburgh-based music label and distributor formed by Gregg Kostelich in 1986. Kostelich used the label to release music by his own band, The Cynics, as well as other local, indie and retro garage rock bands.

Releases
Get Hip has released material by:

References

External links
Official website

American record labels
Companies based in Pittsburgh
Record labels established in 1986
1986 establishments in Pennsylvania